{{Infobox military unit
| unit_name                     = 2784 Governor General's Foot Guards Royal Canadian Army Cadet Corps
| image                         = 
| caption                       = Cap badge of the GGFG
| dates                         = 1965 – present
| country                       = 
| type                          = Youth Organization
| size                          =  One company
| command_structure             = Governor General's Foot Guards
| march                         = Milanollo
| website                       = https://www.2784ggfg.com
| motto                         = ''Latin: Civitas et princeps cura nostra, lit. 'Our country and ruler are our concern| nickname                      = GGFG Cadets, 
The Guards
| garrison                      = Cartier Square Drill Hall, Ottawa
| garrison_label                = Headquarters
| branch                        = Canadian Cadet Organization
| identification_symbol         = 
| identification_symbol_label   = 
}}

The 2784 Governor General's Foot Guards Royal Canadian Army Cadet Corps''' is an Ottawa-based paramilitary youth program jointly-sponsored by the Canadian Forces and the Army Cadet League of Canada. The cadets, as their name implies, are affiliated with the Governor General's Foot Guards (GGFG), which is one of three Royal Household Division regiments in the Canadian Army. As an affiliated unit, the cadets may wear the badges of the GGFG. The cadet corps currently parade at Cartier Square Drill Hall alongside their GGFG counterparts and The Cameron Highlanders of Ottawa (Duke of Edinburgh's Own).

Background
The GGFG Cadet Company was founded by Major Harold Blackman in September 1965. It was formed under the sponsorship of the Governor General's Foot Guards Regiment and has continued to parade with the regiment.  The Kiwanis Club of Ottawa became the Sponsor of the cadet corps beginning in the late 1990s thru to 2016, as a result of the negotiations between the club and former commanding officer, Major Robert Barrette.  The Corps also maintains a good sponsor affiliation with the Royal Canadian Legion's Strathcona Branch 595. The corps also has had a past affiliation with Royal Canadian Legion Eastview (Vanier) Branch 462. The Corps is currently searching for new sponsorships that are being coordinated by the Army Cadet League Liaison Officer.

Summer Camps
The cadet corps provides free summer camp course for cadets who wish to receive training during the summer. The General Training Course only applies to cadets who have completed their first training year, and includes activities such as a field exercise, team-building, air-rifle range, adventure training, and recreational sports. The corps also provides a ceremonial training course for those who wish to learn basic drill requirements and the fundamentals of Canadian marching drill. The two course are two and three weeks long respectively.

Regimental Distinctions 
As an affiliate unit to a regiment of guards, 2784 are entitled to certain regimental distinctions such as uniform accessories and rank names.

Ranks

Guardsman 
Upon completing five months of service with the Army Cadet Program, cadets receive the rank of Guardsman (Gdsm). It is equivalent to the rank of Lance Corporal in the wider RCAC, Leading Air Cadet in the Royal Canadian Air Cadets, or Able Cadet in the Royal Canadian Sea Cadets.

Colour Sergeant 
Colour Sergeant (CSgt) is awarded to cadets who have completed at least six months of service as a Sergeant, successfully completed the Gold Star training program, achieved a minimum of “completed without difficulty” in PO 403 (Leadership), and participated in the Cadet Fitness Assessment.

Uniform 

Upon a cadet's promotion to Guardsman, they receive their cap badge, colloquially referred to as a "guard star," and a new beret with a guards flag backing. In addition, when they receive their promotion to Master Corporal, they are issued a lanyard bearing the colours of the guards flag, and brass maple leaf shoulder badges which are worn on the epaulettes. Sgts receive forage caps with white bands, and those NCOs with senior parade appoints receive drill canes with the badge of the regiment emblazoned near the top. Master and Chief Warrant Officers receive drill canes as well as forage caps with the Regimental Sergeant Major of the corps wearing an old style of GGFG officer's cap badge. The Drill Sergeant Major receives a pace stick in lieu of a drill cane. The unit badges on the shoulder of the tunic of the full dress uniform are red with white text to reflect the status of the corps as one of guards. Although authorized for the use of khaki berets, no cadets have yet been issued them as corps staff are waiting for the affiliated unit to fully distribute them before issuing them to the lower priority cadets.

Obsolete Uniforms 
Prior to the revamp of the army cadet uniform in 2017, GGFG cadets wore shoulder titles bearing the letters "GGFG," as well as senior cadets wearing ascots with the regimental colours.

Drill Hall

See also
2537 Battlefords Army Cadets
Governor General's Foot Guards
Army Cadet League of Canada
Royal Canadian Army Cadets

References

External links 
Official site
Army Cadet League of Canada
 Royal Canadian Army Cadets History – Army Cadet League of Canada
The GGFG official site

Military of Canada
Army cadet organisations
Canadian Cadet organizations
Youth organizations based in Canada
Organizations based in Ottawa
Governor General's Foot Guards